Antaioserpens is a genus of venomous snakes of the family Elapidae.

Species
 Antaioserpens albiceps (Boulenger, 1898) – northeastern plain-nosed burrowing snake, robust burrowing snake
 Antaioserpens warro (Günther, 1863) – Warrego burrowing snake

References

 
Snake genera
Snakes of Australia
Endemic fauna of Australia